Haplophragma sulfureum is a tree in the Bignoniaceae family, found in four countries of Southeast Asia. The pods are used as tinder, while the wood is used for light construction and traditional medicine.

Description
The species grows as a 8 to 20m tall tree. It possesses long "sword-shaped" seed pods. Diameter of the trunk measured at the standard breast height is 10.4 cm for a 6.6m tall specimen.
The root system grows some 60 to 70 cm deep. The wood density is some 5.21g cm−3.

The wood anatomy of the tree is consistent with the variety of traits in the Bignoniaceae. In Heterophragma sulfureum the following traits are present: diffuse solitary vessels; parenchyma marking growth rings; simple perforation plates; scanty paratracheal axial parenchyma; parenchyma are 3-4 cells per strand, 2-4-seriate short rays (<1mm), homo-heterocellular with 1 row of upright marginal cells; the vessel-ray pitting is similar to intervessel pits; septate fibres are present; crystals are present in rays.

Distribution
The species is found in the following countries of Southeast Asia: Thailand, Cambodia, Laos, Myanmar.

Habitat
The plant grows within dry deciduous forests, in undergrowth and in savannahs. In the dry deciduous forests of central Cambodia, it is found in the subcanopy.

Ecology
Newinia heterophragmae, a rust fungus in the Phakopsoraceae family is found on the Heterophragma sulfureum in Myanmar.

Vernacular names
Rungrang is a local name used in Thailand.
In Cambodia the tree is known as srâom daw krâpë (="crocodile scabbard") or srâ âm, Khmer.

Uses
The long seed-pods are dried and de-seeded before being used as tinder for fire-lighting in Cambodia, and the wood is used to build huts.

The traditional healers gathering plants in the Polsongkram Community Forest, Non Sung District, eastern Thailand, boil the heartwood in water to produce a treatment for diabetes.

History
The species was first described by the German-born botanist, Wilhelm Sulpiz Kurz, (1834-1878). His working life including being director of the Botanical Gardens at Bogor, Jawa, and curator of the Herbarium at then Calcutta, India. He published the description in an 1873 issue of the Journal of the Asiatic Society of Bengal.

References

Further reading
Additional information can be found in the following:
Chatterjee, D. (1948). A review of Bignoniaceae of India and Burma Bulletin of the Botanical Society of Bengal 2: 62–79.
Clarke, C.B. in Hooker, J.D. (1885 publ. 1884). Bignoniaceae Flora of British India 4: 376–387.
Dy Phon, P. (2000). Dictionnaire des plantes utilisées au Cambodge: 1–915. Chez l'auteur, Phnom Penh, Cambodia.
Santisuk, T. (1987). Bignoniaceae Flora of Thailand 5(1): 32–66. The Forest Herbarium, National Park, Wildlife and Plant Conservation Department, Bangkok.
Santisuk, T. & Vidal, J.E. (1985). Bignoniacées Flore du Cambodge du Laos et du Viêt-Nam 22: 1-72. Muséum National d'Histoire Naturelle, Paris.

sulfureum
Flora of Cambodia
Flora of Indo-China
Flora of Laos
Flora of Myanmar
Flora of Thailand
Plants described in 1873
Taxa named by Wilhelm Sulpiz Kurz